S-mode #2 is the second single compilation album by Masami Okui, released on 25 February 2004.

Information
This album includes all songs from her singles that were released in January 1996 (9th single) until March 1999 (18th single) under King Records label.
Each disc includes one bonus track.

Track listing

Disc 1
Shake it
 OVA Starship Girl Yamamoto Yohko theme song
 Lyrics, composition: Masami Okui
 Arrangement: Toshiro Yabuki, Tsutomu Ohira

 Anime television series Slayers Next ending song
 Lyrics: Masami Okui
 Composition: Masami Okui, Toshiro Yabuki
 Arrangement: Toshiro Yabuki
Naked Mind
 Radio drama Slayers N.EX opening song
 Lyrics: Masami Okui
 Composition, arrangement: Toshiro Yabuki
J
 OVA Jungle de Ikou! opening song
 Lyrics: Masami Okui
 Composition, arrangement: Toshiro Yabuki

 Anime television series Revolutionary Girl Utena opening song
 Lyrics: Masami Okui
 Composition, arrangement: Toshiro Yabuki

 OVA Starship Girl Yamamoto Yohko opening song
 Lyrics: Masami Okui
 Composition, arrangement: Toshiro Yabuki
Kitto Ashita wa
 Anime television series Ojamajo Doremi ending song
 Lyrics: Masami Okui
 Composition: Masami Okui
 Arrangement: Toshiro Yabuki
Birth
 Anime television series Cyber Team in Akihabara opening song
 Lyrics: Masami Okui
 Composition: Masami Okui, Toshiro Yabuki
 Arrangement: Toshiro Yabuki

 Anime television series CCyber Team in Akihabara soundtrack
 Lyrics: Masami Okui
 Composition, arrangement: Toshiro Yabuki
Never die
 OVA Slayers Excellent theme song
 Lyrics: Masami Okui
 Composition, arrangement: Toshiro Yabuki
Key
 Radio drama Cyber Team in Akihabara theme song
 Lyrics: Masami Okui
 Composition, arrangement: Toshiro Yabuki
Energy (be-show version)
 New version of the song from her first album Gyuu
 Lyrics, composition: Masami Okui
 Arrangement: Nozomi Kanou, be-show

Disc 2
Lonely soul
 OVA Starship Girl Yamamoto Yohko image song
 Lyrics: Masami Okui
 Composition, arrangement: Tsutomu Ohira
Niji no youni (虹のように, Niji no youni?)
 Radio drama Slayers N.EX ending song
 Lyrics, composition: Masami Okui
 Arrangement: Toshiro Yabuki
spirit of the globe
 OVA Jungle de Ikou! ending song
 Lyrics, composition: Masami Okui
 Arrangement: Toshiro Yabuki
I can't...
 Lyrics: Masami Okui
 Composition, arrangement: Toshiro Yabuki
Precious wing
 Lyrics: Masami Okui
 Composition, arrangement: Toshiro Yabuki

 Anime television series Cyber Team in Akihabara ending song
 Lyrics, composition: Masami Okui
 Arrangement: Toshiro Yabuki

 Anime television series Cyber Team in Akihabara soundtrack
 Lyrics: Masami Okui
 Composition, arrangement: Toshiro Yabuki

 Lyrics: Masami Okui
 Composition, arrangement: Toshiro Yabuki

 Lyrics: Masami Okui
 Composition, arrangement: Toshiro Yabuki
Memorial Song
 Original song
 Lyrics, composition, arrangement: Masami Okui

Sources
Official website: Makusonia

2004 compilation albums
Masami Okui albums